Thylaeodus is a genus of sea snails, marine gastropod mollusks in the family Vermetidae, the worm snails or worm shells.

Species
Species within the genus Thylaeodus include:
 Thylaeodus contortus (Carpenter, 1857)
 Thylaeodus equatorialis Spotorno & Simone, 2013
 Thylaeodus indentatus (Carpenter, 1857)
 Thylaeodus rugulosus (Monterosato, 1878)
 Thylaeodus semisurrectus (Bivona-Bernardi, 1832)

References

 Mörch [as Moerch], O.A.L. (1860). Étude sur la famille des vermets (suite). Journal de Conchyliologie, 8: 27–48. [An offprint, reset and seamlessly combined with the previous article of same name (1859) has numbered pages 1–40.

External links
  Bieler, R.; Petit, R. E. (2011). Catalogue of Recent and fossil “worm-snail” taxa of the families Vermetidae, Siliquariidae, and Turritellidae (Mollusca: Caenogastropoda). Zootaxa. 2948, 1-103

Vermetidae